Philanthus gloriosus is a species of bee-hunting wasp found west of the 100th meridian in North America, from Medicine Hat, Alberta south across the High Plains and Rocky Mountains to the Mexican states of Chihuahua, Coahuila, Durango, San Luis Potosí, Hidalgo, Mexico City and Puebla.

References

Crabronidae
Hymenoptera of North America
Insects described in 1865
Taxa named by Ezra Townsend Cresson